Sadayarkovil is a village in Orathanadu Taluk, India. It is located 15 km away from Thanjavur city on the Thanjavur -Mannarkudi highway. This is a part of kulanthaivalanadu (kunthavai vala nadu) thalagramam thuraiyundar kottai. The word Kulanthai comes from "kunthavai", who was the sister of the great Raja raja chola. The word "sadayar" means "Lord shiva". The palangulathu ayyanar temple and veninathaswamy temple are located in this area.

 udaiyar kovil. 
 sadaiyarkovil.
 paruthiyaparkovil.
 aavudaiyar kovil 
 pothu aavudaiyar kovil. 

Villages in Thanjavur district